Ab Barik-e Jonubi (also Romanized as Āb Bārīk-e Jonūbī; also known as Āb Bārīk and Āb-e Bārīk) is a village in Hojr Rural District, in the Central District of Sahneh County, Kermanshah Province, Iran. At the 2006 census, its population was 390 in 92 families.

References 

Populated places in Sahneh County